Arvis FC  is a football club from the Mongolian capital Ulaanbaatar. The club was established in 2010 and was promoted to the Mongolian Premier League for the first time after winning the Mongolia 1st League in 2017. The current head coach is former Mongolian international and all-time leading goalscorer Donorovyn Lümbengarav.

The club also organizes a women's team and has participated in Mongolia's women's league. They have won the 2016 and 2017 seasons of the league.

Domestic history

References

Football clubs in Mongolia
Association football clubs established in 2010
2010 establishments in Mongolia